Arbat-Opera is a chamber musical theatre–enterprise, created in Moscow in 1999. It was created at the initiative of a management of the Central House of Actors in Moscow and Margarita Eskina (1933–2009), who was the director there for many years.

Repertoire
Il campanello di notte (The Night Bell), opera by Gaetano Donizetti
The Coffee Cantata by Johann Sebastian Bach
Il signor Bruschino, opera by Gioachino Rossini
The Servant Mistress, opera by Giovanni Battista Pergolesi
Pietà (Stabat Mater), performance on music of Giovanni Battista Pergolesi
Mozart and Salieri, opera by Nikolai Rimsky-Korsakov
Repentance (Pokaianie), performance on a religious music of Russian composers
Credo, performance on Russian sacred music
La voix humaine, opera by Francis Poulenc
The Requiem, opera by J. Morgulas
Anna & Dedo, opera by J. Morgulas

Russian opera companies
Opera houses in Russia
Musical groups established in 1999
1999 establishments in Russia